Canterwood Crest is a series of novels by author Jessica Burkhart. It begins with the 2009 book Take the Reins. The series follows middle school students at Canterwood Crest Academy, an elite boarding school housing highly competitive equestrian riders. The beginning of the series centers on Sasha Silver, a transfer student at Canterwood Crest. While attending Canterwood, Sasha encounters a disparate collection of students, including snobbish alpha rider Heather Fox and her eventual love interest Jacob. Throughout the series, the team members attempt to work together amidst a slew of personality clashes and romantic conflicts. In later books, the series switches focus to new characters Drew Adams and Lauren Towers.

Overview
Former Connecticut student Sasha Silver plans to join the school's equestrian team. However, she is met with resistance from three popular members known as the "Trio" (Heather, Julia, and Alison), who view her as a threat to their social status. Internal conflict sets the stage for the story, with the initial focus being Sasha's efforts to make the team and sustain her morale and good academics. Jacob begins to earn Sasha's romantic attention. Eventually, this romance begins a conflict with her best friend Callie. Throughout the series, other romantic interests also enter the story, leading to love triangles and other personal matters.

Background

Burkhart was inspired by a combination of equestrian experience during her youth and a fondness for writing as she grew older. After much of her freelance work was published in magazines, she entered the 2006 National Novel Writing Month competition and completed a first draft of Take the Reins. In January 2007, a literary agent offered to read the story after viewing the author's blog. Burkhart was later signed by the agent, which eventually led to a four-book deal with Simon & Schuster.

While promoting the first novel, Burkhart maintained an online presence throughout 2008, blogging and vlogging about the production of her work and the publishing process. In April, the author reported that photoshoots for her covers had been set in motion. By September, Burkhart had received an advance reader copy of Take the Reins while working on the subsequent novels.

In December, it was announced that an additional four novels would gradually follow the fourth book, Triple Fault. Later that month, an online video trailer for Take the Reins was released, featuring photos of scenery and the character models. Trailers for other releases followed.

Characters
Sasha Silver — a girl who comes to Canterwood Crest, Sasha owns a horse named Charm and is roommates with a girl named Paige. Sasha and Callie become best friends from the start. Eventually Sasha meets Jacob, a boy she likes. In book two, Chasing Blue, Heather breaks up Sasha and Jacob. Sasha and Paige get into a fight and Brit Chan becomes Sasha's new best friend and roomie. Sasha makes the YENT (Youth Equestrian National Team) and Callie doesn't because she is so distracted by a boy. Callie breaks up with Jacob and then Sasha and Callie get into a fight. Towards the end of City secrets Sasha meets Jacob and decides to start dating again.

Callie Harper — Sasha's best friend, who clicked with Sasha in book one. Before Callie started at Canterwood, she rode for the elite New England Saddle Club. She has a black Morab gelding horse named Black Jack. Later in the series, Sasha and Callie are no longer friends, only teammates. Callie ends up missing out on a spot on the Youth Equestrian National Team at first because of Jacob, with whom she had a relationship. Callie and Sasha eventually become best friends again.

Heather Fox — the leader of the clique called "the trio", and a fellow student at Canterwood Crest with the reputation of being  a mean girl. She hates Sasha at first, but begins to like her throughout the series. She has a dark chestnut Thoroughbred gelding called Aristocrat. She is very serious about riding and despises Jasmine King. She is a ringleader of trouble and plots to break Jacob and Sasha up at the beginning of the series. Heather's parents put a lot of pressure on her to get good grades and win horse shows.

Julia Myer — the second member of 'The Trio'. Friendships come second to her, riding being the first. Her and Alison are somewhat "sidekicks" of Heather. She has a compact bay mare named Trix. Julia gets expelled from Canterwood Crest after creating a blog in Scandals, Rumors, Lies after she was not picked for the YENT team. Julia dates a boy named Ben.

Alison Robb — the third member of 'The Trio'. She's very quiet, but she observes everyone and everything around her with great detail. She and Julia are somewhat "sidekicks" of Heather. Alison is a lot kinder to Sasha and her friends than Julia. She has a beautiful palomino Arabian horse named Sunstruck.

Jasmine King — a mean girl from another school who Sasha and the Canterwood gang meet at a show. She takes great delight in insulting students from Canterwood Crest. She has a horse named Phoenix. She will do anything to win, even putting her horse at risk. She is introduced in the third book at a Canterwood Crest clinic, making Sasha and the trio miserable. Later, Jasmine transfers from Wellington Prep to Canterwood Crest and frames Allison and Julia for cheating. Jasmine was taking to Sasha and was telling her about how she just slipped sheets of paper in there desk so that it would look like they were cheating. Sasha caught the situation on camera and Jasmine got expelled. 

Jacob Schwartz — a kind, charming, thoughtful boy that Sasha meets at Canterwood Crest. Jacob becomes Sasha's love interest. He likes her and ends up sitting right next to her in Mr. Ramirez's class. He is afraid of horses. Jacob has an on-off relationship with Sasha, but in Unfriendly Competition, begins a permanent relationship with Sasha. 

Eric Rodriguez — another boy Sasha meets. They both become good friends, as Eric is a mid-year transfer student. Eric has a relationship with Sasha, but they break up in Little White Lies after he sees Jacob kissing Sasha in her dorm. They agree to still be friends, and later in the series, Eric helps Jacob in his relationship with Sasha. Eric is a rider, but doesn't own a horse, only riding a school one called Luna who is flea-bitten grey.

Paige Parker — Sasha's roommate, and other best friend. They both met in Take the Reins but Paige moved out following conflict between Paige and Sasha. Paige later lives in the dorm with her friend Geena from cooking class. Paige stars in a show called "Teen Cuisine" and she regularly bakes goodies for Sasha.

Brittany "Brit" Chan — Sasha's new roommate in Orchard Hall. She arrives in Elite Ambition and is called the new "IT" girl. She specializes in dressage and clicks with Sasha from day one. She is a transfer student. She is also from a small town like Sasha, providing an explanation for why they click and become close so quickly. She rides a horse called Apollo. Brit doesn't own Apollo though, instead leasing him to an owner who can reclaim him at any time.

Lauren Towers - a straight-A student who works hard at everything. She loves decorating her dorm in soft colors and loves the decor. Lauren has had a jumping accident in the past, but nothing is going to stop her from doing what she loves. She looks up to Sasha Silver and is best friends with Khloe, Lexa, Clare, Brielle, and Ana. Her boyfriend is Drew Adams, and her ex-boyfriend is Taylor though they do remain friends. She loves tea; her favorite kind being Sugar Cookie Sleigh Ride from the Seasonal Collection. She owns a gorgeous young grey Hanoverian cross Thoroughbred mare called Whisper. Lauren becomes the series' the main character after Sasha graduates from 8th grade and moves up to high school at Canterwood.

Khloe Kinsella — Lauren's friend, and a drama queen. She loves acting and wants her name to be on the Hollywood Walk of Fame. She has long blond hair and brown eyes. Khloe is fierce and loyal to her friends and is the person to keep Lauren laughing. Khloe is Lauren's dorm roommate. She also owns a bay Hanoverian mare called Ever. Khloe and her horse Ever have a great bond.

Lexa Reed - one of the sweetest girls on campus, Lexa is serious about riding but never gets competitive with her friends. She and Lauren share an addiction with Hob Nobs. She has curly black hair with natural reddish highlights, and used to live in London. She owns a strawberry roan mare called Honor.

Clare Bryant — best friends with Khloe and Riley, and is often caught stuck-in-the-middle whenever Riley and Khloe are not getting along with each other, which is all the time. She has wavy red hair. She's a great mediator and the kind of girl who's a true friend. She has a liver chestnut gelding called Fuego.

Riley Edwards — Riley becomes the antagonist at Canterwood during the later books in the series. She and Lauren have never gotten along. She has straight black hair. She is tough in the arena and lets everyone know she means business. Like Khloe, she loves acting. The shared love of theatre with Khloe causes some serious off-stage drama between Riley and Khloe. She owns a grey gelding called Adonis.
        
Taylor Frost — Lauren's ex-boyfriend from Yates Preparatory Academy in Union, Connecticut. He makes an unexpected appearance and admits to Lauren in the 18th book that he had been secretly dating Brielle the last summer Lauren was in Union. Lauren learns to trust him and Brielle again, and all become friends again. In book number 20 they meet again at an afterschool charity fundraiser where he unexpectedly turns up beside her. He pleads her to forgive him for his wrongs and to give him a second chance, she says she would love to but it is no longer possible. That night he spots her and Drew at a local cafe sharing a meal for two under the stars, he realises once and for all that things have moved on and they can only ever be friends.

Brielle Monaco — Lauren's best friend from Yates Preparatory School, and in Union. She makes an unexpected appearance at Canterwood and admits alongside Taylor that the two dated over the summer.

Carina Johansson — a transfer student from Sweden. She came to train at Canterwood Crest Academy to train with Mr. Conner in the foreign exchange program. She excels in dressage, but when Lauren and Khloe dig into Carina's past, they realize there is more than meets the eye. They become good friends when they bond over their love of horses and dressage.

Drew Adams - Lauren's boyfriend at Canterwood. They bonded over their love of horses. Drew owns a calm-natured blood bay Arabian cross Thoroughbred gelding called Polo, who is a strong jumper. Drew is very handsome with dark hair and blue eyes.

References

Novel series